Earl Mortimer College is a coeducational secondary school and sixth form located in Leominster, Herefordshire, England.

It is a community school administered by Herefordshire Council. It replaced the former Minster College and opened in September 2010. It is smaller than the average secondary school.

Earl Mortimer College offers GCSEs and BTECs as programmes of study for pupils, while students in the sixth form have the option to study from a range of A Levels and further BTECs.

School history

The school was originally established as the Minster School. In 2007 the council made the decision to rebuild the school to include a sixth form, using funding from Building Schools for the Future. It then became the Minster College.

The school owns the art work The Minster Triptych by David Jones and students of the school.

School performance and inspections

In 2000, inspection by Ofsted judged the school to be improving.

As of 2021, the school's most recent inspection was in 2017, with a judgement of Good.

References

External links
Official site
Millennium Memory Bank: the accent and dialect of a speaker who attended the school

Buildings and structures in Leominster
Secondary schools in Herefordshire
Educational institutions established in 2010
2010 establishments in England
Community schools in Herefordshire